Sir Daniel Dixon, 1st Baronet,  (28 March 1844 – 10 March 1907) was an Irish businessman and politician.

Early life
Dixon was born on 28 March 1844 the son of Thomas and Sarah Dixon of Larne, County Antrim, his father was a merchant and shipowner. He was educated at the Royal Belfast Academical Institution. He joined his father's timber business, Thomas Dixon and Sons, becoming a partner in 1864.

Political career
He served as Mayor of Belfast in 1892 and as Lord Mayor of Belfast in three terms; 1893, 1901 to 1903, and 1905 to 1906. He was also a member of parliament for Belfast North as an Irish Unionist from 1905 to 1907.

Dixon was appointed to the Privy Council of Ireland in the 1902 Coronation Honours list published on 26 June 1902, and was sworn in by the Lord Lieutenant of Ireland, Earl Cadogan, at Dublin Castle on 11 August 1902. In October 1903 he was created a Baronet, of Ballymenock in the County of Antrim.

Businessman
Dixon was head of one of the largest shipowning companies in Ireland.

Family life
Dixon married, firstly, Lizzie, daughter of James Agnew, in 1867. After his first wife's death in 1868 he married, secondly, Annie, daughter of James Shaw, in 1870. He died on 10 March 1907 in Belfast, aged 62, and was succeeded in the baronetcy by his eldest son Thomas. Lady Dixon died in 1918.

References

Kidd, Charles, Williamson, David (editors). Debrett's Peerage and Baronetage (1990 edition). New York: St Martin's Press, 1990.

External links 
 

1844 births
1907 deaths
Baronets in the Baronetage of the United Kingdom
Deputy Lieutenants of Down
Dixon, Daniel, 1st Baronet
Irish Unionist Party MPs
Members of the Parliament of the United Kingdom for Belfast constituencies (1801–1922)
UK MPs 1906–1910
Members of the Privy Council of Ireland
19th-century Irish businesspeople